Pavel Bečka (born November 7, 1970) is a former Czech professional basketball player. Bečka mainly played as a center.

Professional career
Bečka spent the majority of his pro career with EWE Baskets Oldenburg. His jersey number 8 was retired by the club.

National team career
Bečka also represented the senior Czechoslovakian national team, and later the senior Czech Republic national team. He played at the 1991 EuroBasket, and at the 1999 EuroBasket.

References

1970 births
Living people
Czech expatriate basketball people in Germany
Czech men's basketball players
Centers (basketball)
EWE Baskets Oldenburg players
Power forwards (basketball)
Sportspeople from Ústí nad Labem